Xenorma biorbiculata is a moth of the family Notodontidae. It is endemic to the Upper Amazon of Brazil.

References

Moths described in 1909
Notodontidae of South America
Endemic fauna of Brazil